The final of the Men's 100 metres Butterfly event at the European LC Championships 1997 was held on Wednesday 20 August 1997 in Seville, Spain.

Finals

Qualifying heats

Remarks

See also
1996 Men's Olympic Games 100m Butterfly
1997 Men's World Championships (SC) 100m Butterfly

References
 scmsom results
 La Gazzetta Archivio
 swimrankings

B
Men's 100 metre butterfly